Alfred Squire Crowe (5 July 1879–1957) was an English footballer who played in the Football League for Woolwich Arsenal.

References

1870s births
1957 deaths
English footballers
Association football forwards
English Football League players
Arsenal F.C. players